Bocanda Airport is an airport serving Bocanda in Côte d'Ivoire.

Airports in Ivory Coast
Buildings and structures in Lacs District
N'Zi Region